Marcos Aurelio Górriz Bonhora (born 4 March 1964) is a former professional tennis player from Spain. He is now a tennis coach; among his students is Alejandro Falla.

Career
Górriz took part in 13 Grand Slam tournaments during his career. From his 11 singles appearances he made the second round twice. The first time was in the 1992 French Open who he beat world number 29 Omar Camporese, before being eliminated in the next round by Michael Chang in four sets. In the 1993 Wimbledon Championships he also made the second round, with a win over Slava Doseděl. On this occasion he lost in the second round to Todd Martin.

The Spaniard made at least one quarter-final appearance on the ATP Tour every year from 1990 to 1994. His best performance came in the 1991 Kremlin Cup, when he was a semi-finalist.

As a doubles player he had more success, winning a title at Genova in 1991, with Alfonso Mora. He was also runner-up at two tournaments.

ATP career finals

Doubles: 3 (1–2)

Challenger titles

Singles: (4)

Doubles: (6)

Notes

References

1964 births
Living people
Spanish male tennis players
Tennis players from Barcelona
Tennis players from Catalonia
20th-century Spanish people